The International Association of Judicial Independence and World Peace is a non-profit organization that promotes judicial independence in national court systems around the world. Judicial independence allows court systems to enforce the rule of law without interference by political or other governmental authorities.

History 
The association began in the 1980s. It conducted international projects and adopted international standards on judicial independence. The association promoted the New Delhi Minimum Code of Judicial Independence, adopted in cooperation with the International Bar Association in 1982; the Montreal Declaration on the independence of justice adopted in cooperation with The World Association of Justice in 1983; and The Mount Scopus Standards of Judicial Independence in 2008.

Aims 

To promote the principle of judicial independence as a central foundation of democracy and peace, domestic and international
To strive to encourage and support the building of culture of judicial independence
To draft international standards of judicial independence and to revise them from time to time, based on the  work and deliberations of an international team of jurists
To conduct research projects on judicial independence and world peace
To promote the ideals of peace, democracy, freedom and liberty by strengthening and maintaining judicial independence in all its aspects
To help judges, judiciaries and jurists when they face threats or challenges to judicial independence
To conduct conferences on judicial independence
To initiate educational projects promoting judicial independence
To follow up challenges or threats to judicial independence or practices adversely affecting judicial independence
To support a culture of peace in all its aspects

Main activities

1980-82: The members of the Association developed  The Code of Minimum Standards of Judicial Independence that were adopted in New Delhi, under the framework of the International Bar Association. This was done in conferences in Berlin, Lisbon, Jerusalem and New Delhi.

1983: The members took part in drafting the Montreal Universal Declaration on the Independence of Justice.

1985: The works of the project conducted during 1980-1985  were published in Prof. Shimon Shetreet and Chief Justice Jules Deschênes, ed., Judicial independence: The contemporary debate.

1986: General Report on human rights was presented at the 12th Congress of Comparative Law, Sydney, Melbourne, Australia.

1991: The major report on "Independence and Responsibility of Judges and Lawyers" was presented in the International Congress of the World Association on Procedural Law, Coimbra - Lisbon, Portugal.

2000: The members of the Association contributed to the study of the Discretionary Power of the Judge, in the 50th Anniversary of the International Association of Procedural Law, University of Ghent.

1999-2009: Members of the Association took part in the Culture of Peace Project and in the Religions for Peace Organization International (RPO International) and organized conferences around the world.

2007-2012: Revision during series of conferences in Jerusalem 2007, Vadouz 2007, Jerusalem 2008, Kraków 2008, Cambridge  2009, Utah 2010, Vienna 2011, Hong Kong 2012 and Ghent 2012 of the 1982 New-Delhi Minimum Standards of Judicial Independence which was concluded in the Mt. Scopus International Standards on Judicial Independence.

Officers and advisory board
The members of the Association are distinguished jurists and scholars from all around the world.

Officers 
 President - Prof. Shimon Shetreet
 Vice President - Prof. Daniel Thurer
 Vice President - Adv. Markus BuechelDeceased 9 July 2013
 Vice President - Prof. Marcel Storme
 Secretary and Treasurer - Adv. Gian Andrea Danuser
 Auditor - Prof. Heinz C. Hoefer - Liechtenstein

Advisory board

Co-Chairs
 Professor Christopher Forsyth, University of Cambridge
 Professor Marcel Storme, University of Ghent

Vice Chair
 K. K. Venugopal, Senior Advocate, Supreme Court  India

Members
 Advocate Markus Buechel, Senior Advocate, Liechtenstein
 Professor Anton Cooray, City University of Hong Kong
 Professor Maimon Schwartzschild, University of San Diego
 Professor Dr.  Fryderyk Zoll, Jagiellonski University and University of Osnabruck
 Professor Wayne McCormack, The University of Utah
 Professor Dr. Walter Rechberger, University of Vienna

Conferences
The Association and its members organized numerous conferences around the world. In the last decade, the Association organized conferences in Ghent, Belgium (October 2012), Hong Kong City, Hong Kong (March 2012), Vienna, Austria (2011), Salt Lake City, USA (2010), Cambridge, UK (2009), Kraków, Poland (November 2008), Jerusalem, Israel (March 2008), Vaduz, Lichtenstein (December 2007) and Jerusalem, Israel (June 2007).

One conference was held at the University of San Diego in August 2013, and focused on Judicial Independence World Peace and the Rule of Law The last conference was held in Moscow (May 29 - June 1, 2014), organised by Dmitry Magonya, Dmitry Maleshin and Irina Reshetnikova.

The New Delhi Code of Minimum Standards of Judicial Independence 
The 1982 New Delhi Code provided for necessary safeguards of judicial independence on the following aspects:

 Personal and Substantive Independence
 Judicial Conduct
 Collective Independence
 Internal Independence
 Judges and the Executive
 Security of Judicial Tenure
 The Legislature and Judges
 Standards of Judicial Selection

Mount Scopus International Standards 
The 2008 Mount Scopus International Standards emphasized the importance of maintaining constitutional safeguards of judicial Independence and securing judicial independence from numerous aspects including: collective independence of the judiciary, internal independence of the judge vis-a-vi his colleagues and his administrative superiors, the significance of insuring a reflective judiciary, one that reflects all sectors of society and the importance of providing educate resources for the judiciary to perform its functions, and the total separation of powers between judicial functions and executive responsibility.

Publications

 Shimon Shetreet and Jules Deschenes, Judicial Independence: The Contemporary Debate (1985 Martinus Nijhoff).

 Shimon Shetreet and Christopher Forsyth, The Culture of Judicial Independence: Conceptual Foundations and Practical Challenges.

References

External links 
 International Association of Judicial Independence and World Peace

International law organizations
Legal organisations based in India